Robert Draper of Bath, Somerset (died 1395/96), was an English politician.

He was a Member (MP) of the Parliament of England for Bath in 1395 and Mayor of Bath c. September 1395  before May 1396.

References

14th-century births
1390s deaths
English MPs 1395
Mayors of Bath, Somerset